Noxontown consists of the remaining buildings and structures associated with a country mill site and village located near Middletown, New Castle County, Delaware. They are a house, small frame mill, shed, and mill dam. The house was built by Thomas Noxon about 1740, and is a -story, four bay, brick dwelling with a two-story brick wing.

The -story frame mill predates the house.  It measures 30 feet by 40 feet and has a metal roof.  Noxontown was an important trading and milling center throughout the Colonial period.  The mill was in operation as a merchant mill until 1855 and thereafter solely as a custom mill.

It was listed on the National Register of Historic Places in 1973.

All the buildings of Noxontown are now owned by St. Andrew's School.

References

External links

Historic American Engineering Record in Delaware
Houses on the National Register of Historic Places in Delaware
Grinding mills on the National Register of Historic Places in Delaware
Houses completed in 1740
Houses in New Castle County, Delaware
Grinding mills in Delaware
National Register of Historic Places in New Castle County, Delaware
1740 establishments in the Thirteen Colonies